The List of members of the House of Representatives is the list of members of the House of Representatives of the Netherlands the Lower house of the States-General of the Netherlands. The members elected in the Dutch general election of 2006. There has been a sizable number of mutations since due to the particular nature of the Dutch constitutional system. New members are supplied from their party lists so the resignation of individual members' seats does not change the balance of power in the States-General of the Netherlands. The term started on 30 November 2006 and ended on 16 June 2010.

Christian Democratic Appeal (41 seats)

 Pieter van Geel
 Annie Schreijer-Pierik 
 Joop Atsma
 Mirjam Sterk
 Jan Schinkelshoek 
 Jan de Vries
 Liesbeth Spies
 Kathleen Ferrier
 Ans Willemse-van der Ploeg
 Corien Jonker 
 Eddy Bilder 
 Raymond Knops 
 Sander de Rouwe 
 Madeleine van Toorenburg  
 Antoinette Vietsch

 Sabine Uitslag
 Henk Jan Ormel
 Nihat Eski
 Sybrand van Haersma Buma
 Coskun Çörüz
 Eddy van Hijum
 Bas Jan van Bochove
 Ger Koopmans
 Rendert Algra
 Elly Blanksma-van den Heuvel 
 Ad Koppejan 
 Rikus Jager
 Cisca Joldersma

 Jan Jacob van Dijk
 Janneke Schermers 
 Jan Mastwijk
 Frans de Nerée tot Babberich
 Jack Biskop 
 Ine Aasted Madsen
 Hein Pieper
 Jan ten Hoopen
 Pieter Omtzigt
 Nicolien van Vroonhoven-Kok
 Maarten Haverkamp
 Marleen de Pater-van der Meer
 Margreeth Smilde

Dutch Labour Party (33 seats)

 Mariëtte Hamer
 Jan Boelhouwer 
 Ton Heerts 
 Martijn van Dam
 Marianne Besselink 
 Khadija Arib, 
 Paul Tang 
 Margot Kraneveldt 
 Pierre Heijnen
 Mei Li Vos 
 Marjo van Dijken

 Attje Kuiken 
 Patricia Linhard
 Gerdi Verbeet (President of the House of Representatives)
 Anja Timmer
 Pauline Smeets
 Hans Spekman
 Angelien Eijsink
 Diederik Samsom
 Chantal Gill'ard 
 Staf Depla
 Agnes Wolbert 

 Jeroen Dijsselbloem
 Lutz Jacobi 
 Paul Kalma 
 Samira Abbos
 John Leerdam
 Lia Roefs
 Luuk Blom
 Lea Bouwmeester 
 Eelke van der Veen 
 Roos Vermeij 
 Harm Evert Waalkens

Socialist Party (25 seats)

 Agnes Kant
 Jan Marijnissen
 Sadet Karabulut  
 Harry van Bommel
 Jan de Wit
 Krista van Velzen
 Ewout Irrgang
 Ronald van Raak 
 Emile Roemer 

 Renske Leijten 
 Paul Ulenbelt 
 Manja Smits 
 Sharon Gesthuizen 
 Jasper van Dijk 
 Trix de Roos
 Hans van Leeuwen 
 Fons Luijben 

 Paulus Jansen 
 Remi Poppe
 Arda Gerkens
 Farshad Bashir
 Henk van Gerven 
 Marianne Langkamp 
 Hugo Polderman
 Paul Lempens

People's Party for Freedom and Democracy (21 seats)

 Mark Rutte
 Fred Teeven 
 Johan Remkes
 Edith Schippers
 Atzo Nicolaï
 Laetitia Griffith 
 Charlie Aptroot

 Ton Elias
 Willibrord van Beek
 Cees Meeuwis
 Brigitte van der Burg 
 Anouchka van Miltenburg
 Mark Harbers 
 Helma Neppérus 

 Ineke Dezentjé Hamming-Bluemink
 Stef Blok
 Paul de Krom
 Halbe Zijlstra 
 Han ten Broeke
 Frans Weekers
 Janneke Snijder-Hazelhoff

Party for Freedom (9 seats)

 Geert Wilders
 Fleur Agema
 Raymond de Roon

 Hero Brinkman
 Martin Bosma
 Dion Graus

 Richard de Mos 
 Teun van Dijck
 Sietse Fritsma

GreenLeft (7 seats)

 Femke Halsema
 Kees Vendrik
 Jolande Sap

 Mariko Peters
 Ineke van Gent

 Naïma Azough
 Tofik Dibi

ChristianUnion (6 seats)

 Arie Slob
 Joël Voordewind

 Esmé Wiegman-van Meppelen Scheppink 
 Ed Anker

 Cynthia Ortega-Martijn
 Ernst Cramer

Democrats 66 (3 seats)

 Alexander Pechtold
 Fatma Koşer Kaya 
 Boris van der Ham

Party for the Animals (2 seats)

 Marianne Thieme
 Esther Ouwehand

Reformed Political Party (2 seats)

 Bas van der Vlies
 Kees van der Staaij

Proud of the Netherlands (1 seat)

 Rita Verdonk

Changes

Changes in 2006
 30 November: Tiny Kox (Socialist Party) does not take his seat. In his place, Hugo Polderman takes the oath on 5 December 2006.

Changes in 2007
 21 February: Jan Peter Balkenende, Maxime Verhagen, Maria van der Hoeven, Piet Hein Donner, Gerda Verburg and Cees van der Knaap (all CDA), Wouter Bos, Nebahat Albayrak, Jet Bussemaker, Sharon Dijksma, Bert Koenders en Frans Timmermans (all Labour Party) and André Rouvoet and Tineke Huizinga-Heringa (ChristianUnion) become either minister or junior minister in the Fourth Balkenende cabinet triggering their resignations from the House of Representatives.
 1 March: Joop Wijn (CDA) decides to end his political career and resigns from the House of Representatives. 
 1 March: The seats vacated by Joop Wijn and members of the Cabinet are taken up by Ans Willemse-van der Ploeg, Corien Jonker, Eddy Bilder, Raymond Knops, Sander de Rouwe, Madeleine van Toorenburg and Antoinette Vietsch (CDA), Khadija Arib, Paul Tang, Margot Kraneveldt, Pierre Heijnen, Mei Li Vos en Marjo van Dijken (Labour Party) and Esmé Wiegman-van Meppelen Scheppink and Ed Anker (ChristianUnion).
 20 November: Ferd Crone (Labour Party) resigns from the House of Representatives after being nominated mayor of Leeuwarden. Anja Timmer takes the oath on the same day.

Changes in 2008
 1 January: Aleid Wolfsen (Labour) resigns his parliamentary seat after being appointed mayor of Utrecht. He was succeeded on 15 January Jan Boelhouwer.
 15 January: Rosita van Gijlswijk (SP) resigns her parliamentary seat in order to take up a position in the Socialist Party Board. Farshad Bashir takes her seat the same day. Being twenty years and one day of age he is the youngest ever member of the House of Representatives. 
 23 January: Jules Kortenhorst (CDA) resigns his seat to become director of the European Climate Foundation. Margreeth Smilde, formerly a member of the House of Representatives from 2002 to 2006 takes the oath the same day.
 8 April: Sabine Uitslag (CDA) becomes a temporary member of parliament with Mirjam Sterk taking four months of maternity leave. Her membership of the House of Representatives expires automatically with Mirjam Sterk's return on 29 July 2008.  
 8 April: Ron Abel (SP) resigns his seat for health reasons. He is succeeded on 22 April 2008 by Manja Smits.
 17 April: Nicolien van Vroonhoven-Kok (CDA) takes maternity leave. Her seat is taken by Ine Aasted-Madsen until 17 August 2008.
 2 September: Wijnand Duyvendak (GreenLeft) resigns his seat after revelations concerning his past as a political activist. Karien van Gennip (CDA) leaves after taking up a management position with ING and Roland Kortenhorst (CDA) resigns in order to start up a new business venture. Jolande Sap takes Duyvendak's seat. Sabine Uitslag and Ine Aasted-Madsen take the oath as permanent members of the House of Representatives.
 2 September: Mariko Peters (GreenLeft) takes maternity leave. Isabelle Diks takes her seat until 21 December 2008.
 18 December: Henk Kamp (VVD) resigns his seat after being appointed as commissioner for Bonaire, Sint Eustatius and Saba. He is succeeded by Ton Elias on the same day.

Changes in 2009
 1 January:  (SP) leaves because of personal reasons. She is succeeded on 13 January by Trix de Roos.
 10 March: Jos Hessels (CDA) resigns his seat because he has been appointed member of the States Deputed for Limburg. His successor Hein Pieper takes the oath on 17 March 2009.
 1 May: Jacques Tichelaar (Labour Party) resigns his seat after being nominated Queen's Commissioner of Drenthe. He is succeeded by Patricia Linhard.
 14 July: Hans van Baalen (VVD), Wim van de Camp (CDA) and Barry Madlener (PVV) become member of the European Parliament after the elections in June and therefore resign their seats. Cees Meeuwis (VVD), Rendert Algra (CDA) en Richard de Mos (PVV) take the oath on 1 September.
 18 November: Arend Jan Boekestijn (VVD) resigns his seat after statements about the confidential meeting between Members of the House of Representatives and Queen Beatrix. He is succeeded by Mark Harbers.
 11 December: Ruud van Heugten (CDA) resigns because of his appointment as States Deputed of North Brabant. 
 15 December: Nihat Eski (CDA) replaces Ruud van Heugten.

Changes in 2010
 19 January: Attje Kuiken (PvdA) takes a maternity leave for four months. Saskia Laaper is replacing her.
 9 February: Chantal Gill'ard (PvdA) is replaced by Keklik Yücel till 31 May 2010.
 11 May: Staf Depla (PvdA) resigns because of his appointment as alderman of Eindhoven.
 12 May: Nebahat Albayrak (PvdA) replaces Stef Depla.

2006–2010